Naoki Nakamura (中村 直樹, Nakamura Naoki, 14 March 1982, Nara) is a professional Japanese drifter. He competes in the D1GP and won the series in 2021. He won its feeder series, D1 Street Legal, 3 times. He is known for his close tandem drifting.

Career 
He was initially part of a street racing team called "Burst". In 2005, he and the team competed in the Ikaten event, and his driving style put him the spotlight.

He started to compete in D1GP in 2005 without initial success. In 2006 he started to compete in D1 Street Legal and, improving with each round, got his first win in 2008 putting him second in the standings behind Naoto Suenaga.

In 2009 he competed against Jikuya Kiyofumi, Masashi Yokoi and Seimi Tanaka for the title, and managed to win 3 times in a row. He defended his title driving an S13 Silvia. Through his time in D1SL he competed in D1GP with D-MAX and took 4th.

In January 2011 he was arrested for street drifting he had done in August 2010. He admitted that he wanted to practice. He lost his D1 License and was unable to compete in D1GP or D1 Street Legal despite his status as D1SL defending champion. He was able to compete in non D1 competitions such as The Drift Muscle, a new drifting competition founded by Keiichi Tsuchiya and Daijiro Inada after they stepped down from D1 management.

In 2012 he switched sponsors from D-MAX to Origin Labo. Continuing to compete in non D1 competitions, he started to use Federal tires. However, in 2013 he returned to D1 Street Legal driving an S13 Silvia again. He won the championship the following year, making him the most successful driver in the series' history. His championship allowed him to participate in the D1GP Exhibition match in Odaiba. Despite driving only a slightly modified version of his D1SL car, he beat many D1GP drivers, losing to Masato Kawabata in the end.

In 2018 Nakamura participated in D1 Lights, a series that replaced D1 Street Legal. Despite not competing full time, he managed to get 2 wins and regain his D1GP license. He switched sponsors to Valino tires. He later competed in the drift class at World Time Attack Challenge in Australia, driving an S15 Silvia he prepared for D1GP the following year.

2019 marked his return to D1GP after nearly a decade. He showed himself to be competitive, winning the Solo run on the third contest of the season, but recorded 34 penalty points in his battle against Hideyuki Fujino after missing all the zones in his lead run and pushing Fujino off the track. In the final round he grabbed his first D1GP and ended the season 6th in the standings. In 2020 he grabbed another win in round 7 of the season and finished 5th in the standings.

The 2021 season was his best year as he grabbed 4 overall and solo run wins and sealed the championship in the penultimate round. He scored 204 points, the first to score more than 200 points in a season. His championship win made him the third person to win both D1GP and D1 Street Legal, after Katsuhiro Ueo and Masashi Yokoi.

In early 2022 he began collaborating with the new TMAR team and was to debut a V8 powered S13 built alongside fellow D1 driver Daigo Saito. The car was fitted with naturally aspirated LSX and was finished mere days before the opening round, but unfortunately the V8 engine was blown during testing and Naoki had to reuse his S15 which shared the same fate as the S13 during practice. He scored no points in the opening round. The S13 returned for the second round, now with a Procharged LS3 previously powering Masanori Kohashi's car in 2018. Upgraded with the newly debuted car he won both rounds.Unfortunately the car is not as reliable as his previous car as he encountered several issue over the season and he ended up finishing third in championship losing the title to Masashi Yokoi. He also performed stunts for the film Alive Drift.

For 2023 season he left TMAR and return as  Valino's works driver and will debut a Toyota GR86 which makes it the first time he compete in a non Nissan S-Chassis car. On 25th December 2022 it is announced that he will bring his D1GP championship winning S15 to compete in Drift Masters European Championship  as full time entry alongside his D1GP campaign.

References

External links 

Living people
D1 Grand Prix drivers
Japanese racing drivers
1982 births